The DG Flugzeugbau DG-1000 is a glider of the Two Seater Class built by DG Flugzeugbau.  It has a retractable engine and propeller. It first flew in July 2000 at Speyer in Germany. There are four models, with 18- and 20-metre wings of HQK-51 profile. The latest DG-1001 variant replaced the DG-505 in production.

With  span wings it is fully certified for aerobatics (+7 -5 g); with a  span wings it is certified for limited aerobatics (+5 -2.65 g).

The engine (DG1000T) is mounted on a pylon aft of the double cockpit. There is a reduction gear (2.3:1.0) between the engine and the two-blade carbon-fibre composite propeller. The propeller was designed by and made in the DG factory.

Operational history

In 2011, the DG-1000 was selected by the USAF as a replacement for the Blanik TG-10. It will serve as a basic soaring trainer for cadets at the United States Air Force Academy.  It also serves as the primary competition platform for the USAF Academy Aerobatic Demonstration Team. Its USAF designation is TG-16A.

Variants
DG1000T
Retractable pylon-mounted engine, aft of the cockpit, with a 2.3:1 reduction gear driving a two-blade carbon-fibre composite propeller,  designed and produced by DG.
DG-1001
Refined version with electric landing gear retraction.
DG-1001e neo
fitted with front electric sustainer – due to fly 2020.
TG-16A
USAF designation. Used to train cadets in soaring at the United States Air Force Academy, replacing the LET TG-10 Blanik.
Akaflieg Karlsruhe AK-9 or  
A  turbojet engine was installed in a two seater DG-1000. In Cooperation with the Institute for Thermal Flowengines at the KIT the behavior of the AMT Titan turbojet, from Dutch producer Draline, was researched, improved and fitted with an exhaust attenuator.

DG-1000J:also known as 'Akaflieg Karlsruhe AK-9', registerd D-KAKJ, named "Jet".

Operators

Military

Royal Australian Air Force
Australian Air Force Cadets – 8

Indonesian Air Force – 3

United States Air Force Academy
94th Flying Training Squadron

Specifications (DG1000T)

Sources
DG-Flugzeugbau website
Specification
DG-1000 The New Two Seater from DG Flugzeugbau

References

External links

2000s German sailplanes
Motor gliders
DG-1000
Single-engined tractor aircraft
T-tail aircraft
Mid-wing aircraft
Aircraft first flown in 2000
Electric aircraft